Canberra Girls Grammar School (CGGS) is an independent, Anglican, day and boarding school predominantly for girls, located in Deakin, a suburb of Canberra, the capital of Australia.

Established in 1926 as St Gabriel's School, by the Church of England religious order, the Community of the Sisters of the Church, Canberra Girls Grammar is the oldest private day and boarding school in Canberra. It has a non-selective enrolment policy and caters for approximately 1,300 students, with co-education from Early Learning (preschool) to Year 3, and girls only from Years 4 to Year 12. Boarding facilities are available on the Senior Campus for up to 80 students in Years 7 to 12. CGGS is also licensed to offer the International Baccalaureate Primary Years Programme and Diploma Programme (for Years 11 and 12). It is a candidate school for the MYP from Yrs 6 to 9.

Canberra Girls Grammar School is affiliated with the Alliance of Girls Schools Australasia (AGSA), the Associated Southern Colleges (ASC), the Association of Heads of Independent Schools of Australia (AHISA), the Australian Boarding Schools' Association (ABSA), and is a member of the Association of Heads of Independent Girls' Schools (AHIGS).

History
St Gabriel's School was established with nine students in 1926, as a day and boarding school for girls, by the Church of England religious order, the Community of the Sisters of the Church (the Kilburn Sisters). It catered for the small but growing community in what was designated as the new Federal capital. 

From 1926 to early 1928, the Old Rectory of St John the Baptist Church, Reid, was leased from the Government by the Kilburn Sisters. The rectory was known as Glebe House, and was close to the city. In May 1927, the day before the opening of Parliament House, the foundation stone of the current site on Melbourne Avenue at Deakin, was laid by Lewis Radford, Bishop of the then Diocese of Goulburn. The school officially moved into its new site in 1928. In 1933, the school was renamed Canberra Church of England Girls Grammar School (CCEGGS).

CCEGGS was nearly closed down during the Great Depression, and sold some of its land in order to remain solvent. A boom period in the 1970s saw the school expand, with the Junior School moving to a new Campus in Grey Street, Deakin, to cater for a surge in enrolments. Today the junior school remains on a separate campus within the suburb. In 2001, the school name changed again, this time to its current form Canberra Girls Grammar School (CGGS). In 2004, CGGS opened an Early Learning Centre (preschool) catering for 3- to 5-year-olds on its Junior School campus.

Principals

Campus

Canberra Girls Grammar School is located over two campuses (primary and secondary) in the inner Canberra suburb of Deakin, within view of Australia's Parliament House.

The School's most recent additions include a music centre with an adjoining 1,000-seat hall. 2006 saw improvements made to the junior school with the opening of six new classrooms, two music rooms and practice rooms and in 2010 the addition of a new multi-purpose hall, administration block, front office and staff offices. In the senior campus a new administration block, drive through and entrance was built in 2011 and a new award-winning science wing completed in 2012.

Curriculum
Canberra Girls Grammar School was authorized to offer the International Baccalaureate World School Diploma Programme on 21 July 2010. The school was also authorized to offer the Primary Years Programme on 15 September 2011.

Junior school
The junior school curriculum is based upon the New South Wales Department of Education Board of Studies syllabus. It also has many co-curricular studies.

Senior school
Students in the senior school (Years 7 to 12) are prepared for the ACT Year 12 Certificate, as mandated by the Board of Senior Secondary Studies.

A high percentage of students who graduate with a Year 12 Certificate also obtain an ATAR and go on to study at university. In 2007, of the 150 students awarded a Year 12 certificate, 91% were awarded Tertiary Education Statements. Also that year, the median ATAR gained by students was 86 compared with the average of students from all across ACT colleges of 79. Students from Canberra Girls Grammar School had the second highest median ATAR of the ACT colleges that year, and in 2009 they achieved the highest score. 92% of students from the school who were awarded Tertiary Education Statements in 2007 scored over 65 for their ATAR compared with 79% of all ACT students.

Students in Years 11 and 12 are also given the option to study the International Baccalaureate instead of the BSSS curriculum.

House system
As with most Australian schools, Canberra Girls Grammar School utilises a house system for activities and competitions. The system forms the basis of its pastoral care programme. Students in the senior school are divided into six houses:
Burgmann, named after E H Burgmann, bishop of Canberra and Goulburn from 1950 to 1960
Deakin, named after the suburb in which the school is situated and former prime minister Alfred Deakin
Glebe, named after the building in which the school was first established
Kilburn, named after the suburb in London where the Mother House of the Order of Sisters of the Church was located
Robertson, named after Archdeacon C W Robertson
Waverley, named after the Sydney suburb of Waverley where the Mother House of the Order of Sisters of the Church in Australia was located.

Notable alumni

Alumnae of Canberra Girls Grammar School are known as Grammarians and can join the schools alumni association, the Grammarians' Association (GA). The GA was formed as the Old Girls' Union in 1931 and has branches around Australia and overseas. Some notable Old Grammarians include:

Entertainment, media and the arts
 Sibylla Budd – Australian actress
 Stef Dawson – Australian actress
Kate Denborough - Artistic Director Kage Physical Theatre
 Kate Fischer – model, Pru Goward's daughter
 Myfanwy Horne – journalist, writer, reviewer and book editor; wife of Donald Horne
 Samara Weaving – Australian actress, niece of Australian actor, Hugo Weaving
 Sally Whitwell – classical music pianist, composer, arranger, conductor and teacher

Politics, public service and the law
Tupou Draunidalo – Fijian lawyer, Vice-President of the Fiji Law Society and daughter of former Deputy Prime Minister of Fiji, Kuini Speed
Rt Hon Patricia Hewitt – British politician; Labour Member of Parliament (MP) for Leicester West; Former Secretary of State for Health
Katrina Hodgkinson – Australian politician and member of the New South Wales Legislative Assembly
Fiona Patten - Co-founder and past president of the Eros Association; Director of the Australian National Museum of Erotica; Founder and leader of the Australian Sex Party, member of the Victorian Legislative Council

Science and Technology
Marilyn Renfree – Professor of Zoology with a research specialisation in marsupial foetal development
Deborah Terry – Psychology researcher and Vice-Chancellor at the University of Queensland
Sarah Coupland – Australian pathologist

Sport
 Zoe Buckman – Australian representative to the 2012 Olympics in Athletics
Katherine Calder – Winter Olympian
 Gemma Dashwood – Represented Australia in swimming at the 1996 and 2000 Paralympic Games; winner of 4 gold, 3 silver and 1 bronze medal
Dimity Douglas - Australian Olympian (swimming)

See also
 Anglican Church of Australia
 List of schools in the Australian Capital Territory
 List of boarding schools
 Head of the River (New South Wales)
 Associated Southern Colleges
 Sister School Canberra Grammar School

References

External links
 

Girls' schools in the Australian Capital Territory
Grammar schools in Australia
Private secondary schools in the Australian Capital Territory
Boarding schools in the Australian Capital Territory
Educational institutions established in 1926
Anglican schools in the Australian Capital Territory
Primary schools in the Australian Capital Territory
Association of Heads of Independent Girls' Schools
International Baccalaureate schools in Australia
1926 establishments in Australia
Alliance of Girls' Schools Australasia